"Borderline" is a song recorded by American country music group The Shooters. It was released in October 1988 as the first single from their album Solid as a Rock. The song peaked at number 13 on the Billboard Hot Country Singles chart. Lead vocalist Walt Aldridge wrote and produced the song.

Chart performance

References

1988 songs
1988 singles
The Shooters songs
Songs written by Walt Aldridge
Epic Records singles